Jackson Richardson (born 14 June 1969) is a retired French handball player. As the captain of the French handball team, he was the flag carrier during the Olympic Games opening ceremony in Athens on 13 August 2004.

Biography
Richardson then signed a contract with the club Paris-Asnières in 1989, and started to be well known with his first games for the national team.

Two years later, he was transferred to OM Vitrolles, the team with which he won the French League in 1994 and 1996, the French Cup in 1993 and 1995, and the Cup Winners' Cup in 1993. After that he went to Germany to play with the team of TV Großwallstadt, with which he won the European Cities Cup in 2000.

The summit of his club career occurred in Spain, where he played with Portland San Antonio, winning the Champions League against FC Barcelona Handbol in 2001 and the Spanish League the following year.

Richardson came back to France in 2005 to play with Chambéry Savoie Handball.

With the French national team, Jackson has won two world championships in 1995 and 2001 (and four other medals, in 1993, 1997, 2003 and 2005), a bronze medal in the 1992 Summer Olympics in Barcelona, and the title of IHF Best player in the world in 1995. He holds by far the record of the most caps for France with more than 400 games. The French handball federation prepared him an outstanding party to celebrate his goodbye to the national team, at the Paris-Bercy tournament, with many sport figures present, although the most important was the presence of his mother, who came from their native Reunion Island to be with her son Jack in such an important day.

Richardson was certainly one of the most talented players of his time. His very instinctive style was the combination of constant hard working and genial improvisation, which made him one of the top players in the world for more than 15 years.

Richardson retired after a great Chambéry Savoie Handball vs US Ivry match. He is married and has two children. His son, Melvyn, is a player on the France men's national handball team.

France national team
 First cap: 10 January 1990 against Algeria
 Goals: 775 (5 penalties)
 Number of caps: 417
 Last international game: 5 February 2005 against Croatia

Clubs
 Saint-Pierre de la Réunion
 1989-91 :  Paris-Asnières 
 1991-96 :  OM Vitrolles 
 1996-00 :  TV Großwallstadt 
 2000-05 :  Portland San Antonio 
 2005-08 :  Chambéry Savoie Handball 
 2009-09 :  Rhein-Neckar Löwen

Honours
With France
 2 World Championships (1995, 2001)
 Bronze medal in the Olympic Games (1992)
 Silver medal in the World Championship (1993)
 Bronze medal in the World Championship (1997, 2003, 2005)
With clubs
 1 EHF Champions League (2001 with Portland San Antonio)
 Champions League final (2003)
 2 European Cup Winners' Cups (1993 with OM Vitrolles, 2004 with Portland San Antonio)
 1 Europe Supercup (2000 with Portland San Antonio)
 1 European Cities Cup (2000 with TV Großwallstadt)
 2 French Leagues (1994, 1996)
 2 Spanish Leagues (2003, 2005)
 2 Coupes de France (1993, 1995)
 1 Copa del Rey (2001)
 2 Spanish Supercups (2001, 2002)
Personal distinctions
 IHF World Player of the Year (1995)
 MVP of the World Championship (1990, 1995) and European Championship (2000)
 Best playmaker of the World Championship (1995) and European Championship (2000)
 Best playmaker of the EHF Champions League between 1993 and 2013
 Best foreign player of the Spanish League (2001, 2002)
 Best playmaker of the Spanish League (2003, 2004, 2005)

References

1969 births
Living people
People from Saint-Pierre, Réunion
French male handball players
Olympic handball players of France
Olympic bronze medalists for France
Handball players at the 1992 Summer Olympics
Handball players at the 1996 Summer Olympics
Handball players at the 2000 Summer Olympics
Handball players at the 2004 Summer Olympics
Handball players from Réunion
Olympic medalists in handball
Medalists at the 1992 Summer Olympics